Di Captain is a studio album by Freddie McGregor, released on January, 29 in 2013, under VP Records. The album consists of 16 songs, showcasing McGregor's talent for re-interpretation with a selection of cover songs including a remake of his own 1980 hit "Africa (Here I Come)". Other features include "Move Up Jamaica" a spirited tribute for Jamaica's 50th anniversary of independence.

Track listing

Executive producer
Chris Chin

References

Freddie McGregor albums
2013 albums